Container chassis, also called intermodal chassis or skeletal trailer, is a type of semi-trailer designed to securely carry an intermodal container. Chassis are used by truckers to deliver containers between ports, railyards, container depots, and shipper facilities. This type of trucking is sometimes called drayage.

Operation
A container is lifted onto a chassis by a specialized crane, ensuring that the container's corner castings line up with the chassis’ twistlocks (pins). The container is locked to the chassis by engaging the pins. The length of a chassis determines which container length it can accept. For example, a 40-foot-long chassis is used for a 40-foot-long container. Some chassis can be extended or shortened depending on which container needs to be hauled. 

Chassis have a kingpin so they can be connected to a semi-tractor. They also have a pair of legs called landing gear that can be cranked down to park them when not hooked up to a tractor.

Portable generators, also called gensets, can be mounted (underslung) onto chassis. These gensets are used to power a refrigerated container.

In the US, some chassis, especially 20-foot and 53-foot chassis, have sliding tandems. The tandems are pulled back for heavy containers to comply with federal bridge law weight restrictions.

An identification number is usually stenciled on chassis to keep track of each unit in a fleet. According to ISO 6346, a chassis should have the letter "Z" at the end of its reporting mark. For example, ABCZ-123456 7 would mean the equipment is a chassis, specifically, number 1234567 in the fleet of company ABC.   

A variation is the tank container chassis, which are used for portable bulk liquid containers or ISO tank containers. They are characteristically longer and have lower deck height then standard chassis, ideal for transporting constantly shifting payloads. These chassis can also be fitted with additional accessories including: lift kits to facilitate product discharge, hose tubes, and hi/lo kits to carry two empty tanks. The tank chassis has evolved over the years to accommodate greater payload weights. They come in tandem axle, spread axle, tri-axle, and hi/lo combo configurations.

Logistics

United States
An important aspect of drayage in the US is the active engagement of the steamship lines. Through a service called ″carrier haulage″ or ″store door moves″, a steamship line arranges the drayage of its customer’s containers. The steamship line hires a local drayage trucker and pays for chassis rental. Most chassis in the US are currently owned by a few leasing companies (pools) which rent out the equipment to drayage truckers. The pools use EDI to track their chassis, and then invoice the appropriate drayage company for chassis usage, who passes the invoice to the steamship line if it pertains to a carrier haulage job. If a pool knows one if its chassis was used for carrier haulage via the booking or B/L, they may invoice the steamship line directly. In order to lock in capacity at a specified rate for this ″carrier haulage″ service, the steamship line contracts with a particular chassis pool and requires the truckers it hires to use that pool. Some disadvantages of this system are that it can restrict truckers' choice of which chassis to use (especially at wheeled facilities) and it can involve costly "chassis splits", which are when a container and its required chassis pool are in different locations.

Other countries
In most countries other than the US, truckers own or long-term lease container chassis—steamship lines have no influence on chassis.

Shortages
In the United States, container chassis shortages are a chronic problem, especially during peaks in freight volume. There are several causes of chassis shortages, but a common problem is excessive off-terminal dwell time. Off-terminal dwell time is the length of time a shipper keeps a chassis/container at their premises. Long dwell times cause shortages at ports and rail ramps where incoming containers need to be loaded onto chassis.

See also

Semi-trailer
Containerization
Intermodal freight transport
Container port
Sidelifter
Drayage
ISO 6346
Swap body
Roadrailer

References

Further reading

External links

How truckers can avoid a bad dray day – Six tips for truckers about chassis pools
At Ag Exporters’ Meeting, the Chassis Debate Rages On – Discussion about the two types of chassis pools, co-op and proprietary  
Athearn HO scale chassis – Model Railroading magazine, June 1999
RR Rolling Stock Category: Chassis – Picture archives of intermodal chassis in US

Chassis
Intermodal transport
Freight transport
Port infrastructure
Trucks